Dr. Harvey Einbinder (June 18, 1926 – January 30, 2013) was an American physicist, author and amateur historian.

Early life 
Einbinder was born to Jacob B. Einbinder and Dora (née Abelson) in New Haven, Connecticut. He had one brother, David, and one sister, Hinde.

Education 
Einbinder studied for two years at the University of Connecticut (UConn), at first physics but then mathematics in which he received a degree with "highest distinction" in 1946. He later received his Ph.D. in physics from Columbia University.

Career 
He became a consultant to the Cornell Aeronautical Laboratory and to General Electric on the Atlas missile. He published papers on hypersonic aerodynamics and the ionization of solid particles.

Encyclopædia Britannica 
Einbinder spent five years combing the Encyclopædia Britannica for flaws, and found enough to fill a 390-page book, called The Myth of the Britannica, published by Grove Press in 1964. As summarized by The Age two years later, Einbinder's book "showed beyond argument that the Britannica was not a completely impartial and absolutely infallible work of general reference; that 666 articles in the 1963 edition were reprinted from editions dating back to 1875 in some cases; and that American influence on its editorial policy had become dominant".

Einbinder at one point also disputed the historical accuracy of the Black Hole of Calcutta account. Among his other publications are An American Genius: Frank Lloyd Wright, and the play Mah Name is Lyndon.

Private life 
Harvey Einbinder was married to Florence Einbinder, who predeceased him. He died on January 30, 2013, at Mt. Sinai Hospital in New York City.

Publications
 The Myth of the Britannica. New York: Grove Press, 1964 / London: MacGibbon & Kee, 1964 / New York: Johnson Reprint Corp., 1972
 "Politics and the new Britannica", The Nation 220:11:342-4 (1975) – Review of the Britannica 3
An American genius : Frank Lloyd Wright. New York : Philosophical Library, 1986, 
Mah name is Lyndon; a play. Illustrated by Florence Safadi. New York, Lady Bird Press. 1968

References

 De Solla Price, Derek J. (1964)."A Great Encyclopedia Doesn't Have To Be Good?". (Extract) Science, Volume 144, Issue 3619, pp. 665–666. ISSN 0036-8075 (print), 1095-9203 (online). DOI: 10.1126/science.144.3619.665 – Review of Einbinder's The Myth of the Britannica.

Encyclopædia Britannica
American physicists
1926 births
2013 deaths
University of Connecticut alumni
Columbia Graduate School of Arts and Sciences alumni